Gopalbad is an Indian village within the Sarmera Block of Nalanda district in Bihar (India). Nearby cities are Sarmera (6 km away), Barbigha (10 km away), Sheikhpura (26 km away), Bihar Sarif (35 km away), Barh (21 km away) and Mokama (35 km away). The population of  this village is approximately 3500. Agriculture is main industry of this village.

Neighboring villages - North way Lalpura and Darve Bhadaur, South way Ahiyapur, Masuma and Kotra, East way Dhanavan, Kajichak, Hussain and Pranavan, West way Kenar Kala, GaushNagar and Malavan. All other neighboring villages have a good relationship with Gopalbad.
Gopalbad Website name: http://Gopalbad.com

Festivals
The people of Gopalbad celebrate mostly Hindu festivals including:
 Makar Sakranti
 Holi
 Chaiti Durga Puja
 Teej
 Karma
 Ganesh Chaturthi
 Chhath puja
Saraswati Puja :
Earlier Saraswati Puja is celebrated in Gopalbad at Pustkalaya, which is situated near Devisthan and almost every person from Gopalbad participates in the puja. Also natak(play) performed during Sarswati Puja adjacent to Pustakalaya plot and the notable participant was Diwakar Prasad, Late Raghunandand Prasad. But now Sarswati Puja celebrated many places at Gopalbad.

References

 

 Villages in Nalanda district